The Shangri-La Leisure Farm is a tourist attraction farm in Dajin Village, Dongshan Township, Yilan County, Taiwan.

History
The resort originated back from a simple fruit orchard.

Geology
The leisure farm is located about 250 meters above sea level with temperature conditions of four seasons. It overlooks valleys, rivers, plains, farms, islands and ocean. It has several natural ecology such as macaques, tree frogs, firebugs, butterflies and a variety of plants. It spans over an area of 17 hectares.

Activities
The farm also regularly hosts several activities, such as lantern activity, whirligig activity, matzo ball activity and other do-it-yourself activity. It also houses some accommodation services for overnight stay or venues for business meetings.

Transportation
The farm is accessible by taxi or bus from Luodong Station of Taiwan Railways.

See also
 List of tourist attractions in Taiwan

References

External links
 

Farms in Yilan County, Taiwan